State Road 154 (NM 154) is a , paved, two-lane state highway in Doña Ana County in the U.S. state of New Mexico. NM 154's western terminus is in  Hatch at the road's junction with NM 185. The road's eastern terminus is in  Rincon at the road's junction with NM 140. NM 154 is also known as Railroad Road.

Route description
NM 154 parallels the railroad tracks of the El Paso Subdivision of BNSF Railway. The highway begins at the junction with NM 185 in the village of Hatch. The road heads east-northeast through the fields and pecan orchards of Rincon Valley and after  crosses the Rio Grande river over a  bridge, built in 1941. The road continues through agricultural area farther for approximately another 1 mile, before turning east. At  NM 154 reaches its northeastern terminus at intersection with NM 140. The road continues as Doña Ana County Route E 10 past the junction.

History
A road from Hatch to Rincon was constructed some time in early 1940s. In early 1950s the road connecting NM 185 with Rincon passing through Hatch was designated NM 140. In 1988 the New Mexico Department of Transportation (NMDOT) went through a radical road renumbering program, and the stretch from Rincon to Hatch became known as NM 154, whereas the section from Rincon south to NM-185 was designated as NM 140.

Major intersections

See also

 List of state roads in New Mexico

References

External links

 

154
Transportation in Doña Ana County, New Mexico